KBJ may refer to:

Ketanji Brown Jackson, associate justice of the US Supreme Court
KBJ Architects
Kantabanji, Balangir district, Odisha, India
 kbj, the ISO 639 code for the Kari language